The yellow-winged vireo (Vireo carmioli) is a small passerine bird.  It is endemic to the highlands of Costa Rica and western Panama.

This vireo occurs from 2000 m to the timberline in the canopy of mountain forest, sometimes feeding in undergrowth or tall second growth.  The small cup nest is built in the fork of a small branch 3–20 m high in a tree or scrub and the clutch is two dark-spotted white eggs. Both sexes construct the nest, incubate the eggs and feed the young.

The adult yellow-winged vireo is 11.5 cm in length and weighs 13 g. It has olive-green upperparts and blackish wings with two yellow wing bars. There is a yellowish supercilium which joins the interrupted white eye ring.  The throat is white, and the underparts are otherwise pale yellow with some olive on the flanks. Young birds are browner above and have very pale yellow underparts.

Yellow-winged vireos feed on spiders and insects gleaned from tree foliage, and also eat small fruits. They will join mixed-species feeding flocks, or accompany flame-throated warblers.

The yellow-winged vireo has a nasal nit call and the song is a high slurred viree chichu chuyee; viree viree cheeyu; viree witchum vireee.

References

Further reading

 

yellow-winged vireo
Birds of Costa Rica
Birds of Panama
yellow-winged vireo
yellow-winged vireo